PSO J172.3556+18.7734 is an astrophysical jet that was discovered in May 2011. It was originally thought to be a quasar by astronomers, but as of March 8, 2021, it is now classified as a cosmic jet (astrophysical jet). , it is the farthest radio-loud quasar discovered with a redshift of 6.82.

See also
 List of the most distant astronomical objects
 List of quasars
 J0313–1806

References

Astronomy
Quasars